Zaftek Sargdar (also Romanized as Zaftek Sargdār) is a village in Gavkan Rural District, in the Central District of Rigan County, Kerman Province, Iran. At the 2006 census, its population was 139, in 24 families.

References 

Populated places in Rigan County